The Italian Instabile Orchestra (IIO) is an eighteen piece experimental big band that performs orchestral jazz and avant-garde jazz. Its members include Alberto Mandarini, Bruno Tommaso, Carlo Actis Dato, Daniele Cavallanti, Eugenio Colombo, Giancarlo Schiaffini, Gianluigi Trovesi, Giorgio Gaslini, Giovanni Maier, Guido Mazzon, Mario Schiano, Martin Mayes, Paolo Damiani, Pino Minafra, Sebi Tramontana, Tiziano Tononi, Umberto Petrin, and Vincenzo Mazzone.

The orchestra was founded in 1990 to perform at the Festival di Noci. One of the original members, pianist Giorgio Gaslini, later left the orchestra. Some guest musicians that have performed or recorded with them include Cecil Taylor, Willem Breuker and Lester Bowie.

Discography
 Live in Noci and Rive-De Gier (Leo, 1991)
 Skies of Europe (ECM, 1994)
 European Concerts '94–'97 (Neljazz, 1997)
 Litania Sibilante (Enja, 2000)
 Previsioni del Tempo: Forecast (Imprint, 2002)
 The Owner of the River Bank (Enja/Justin Time, 2004) with Cecil Taylor
 Creative Orchestra: Bolzano 2007, (Rai Trade, 2010)
 Totally Gone (Goodfellas/Rai Trade, 2010)

See also
List of experimental big bands

References

Avant-garde jazz ensembles
Big bands
ECM Records artists
Enja Records artists
Experimental big bands
Leo Records artists